Peter Martin (born 29 December 1950) is an English former footballer who played as a left winger in the Football League for Darlington and Barnsley. He began his senior career with Middlesbrough, without playing for them in the League, and went on to play in the Southern League for Cambridge City (in three spells), Chelmsford City, and Bedford Town.

References

1950 births
Living people
Footballers from South Shields
English footballers
Association football wingers
Middlesbrough F.C. players
Darlington F.C. players
Carlisle United F.C. players
Barnsley F.C. players
Cambridge City F.C. players
Chelmsford City F.C. players
Bedford Town F.C. players
English Football League players
Southern Football League players